Fairfield Township may refer to:

Illinois
 Fairfield Township, Bureau County, Illinois

Indiana
 Fairfield Township, DeKalb County, Indiana
 Fairfield Township, Franklin County, Indiana
 Fairfield Township, Tippecanoe County, Indiana

Iowa
 Fairfield Township, Buena Vista County, Iowa
 Fairfield Township, Cedar County, Iowa
 Fairfield Township, Fayette County, Iowa
 Fairfield Township, Grundy County, Iowa
 Fairfield Township, Jackson County, Iowa
 Fairfield Township, Palo Alto County, Iowa

Kansas
 Fairfield Township, Russell County, Kansas

Michigan
 Fairfield Township, Lenawee County, Michigan
 Fairfield Township, Shiawassee County, Michigan

Minnesota
 Fairfield Township, Crow Wing County, Minnesota
 Fairfield Township, Swift County, Minnesota

Missouri
 Fairfield Township, Carroll County, Missouri

Nebraska
 Fairfield Township, Clay County, Nebraska
 Fairfield Township, Harlan County, Nebraska

New Jersey
 Fairfield Township, Cumberland County, New Jersey
 Fairfield Township, Essex County, New Jersey

North Carolina
 Fairfield Township, Hyde County, North Carolina, in Hyde County, North Carolina

North Dakota
 Fairfield Township, Grand Forks County, North Dakota, in Grand Forks County, North Dakota

Ohio
 Fairfield Township, Butler County, Ohio
 Fairfield Township, Columbiana County, Ohio
 Fairfield Township, Highland County, Ohio
 Fairfield Township, Huron County, Ohio
 Fairfield Township, Madison County, Ohio
 Fairfield Township, Tuscarawas County, Ohio
 Fairfield Township, Washington County, Ohio

Pennsylvania
 Fairfield Township, Crawford County, Pennsylvania
 Fairfield Township, Lycoming County, Pennsylvania
 Fairfield Township, Westmoreland County, Pennsylvania

South Dakota
 Fairfield Township, Beadle County, South Dakota, in Beadle County, South Dakota

Township name disambiguation pages